Mount Unwin is a  mountain summit located on the west side of Maligne Lake in Jasper National Park, in the Queen Elizabeth Range of the Canadian Rockies of Alberta, Canada. Its nearest higher peak is Mount Brazeau,  to the east-southeast.


History
The peak was named in 1908 by Mary Schäffer for her guide and companion, Sidney Unwin, who had climbed the peak in an effort to locate the elusive Maligne Lake which she was trying to find. Mary named many of the mountains around the lake, including Mount Charlton, Maligne Mountain, and Mount Warren.

The mountain's name was made official in 1947 by the Geographical Names Board of Canada.

Climate
Based on the Köppen climate classification, Mount Unwin is located in a subarctic climate zone with cold, snowy winters, and mild summers. Precipitation runoff from Mount Unwin drains down the Maligne River, which is a tributary of the Athabasca River.

References

External links
 Parks Canada web site: Jasper National Park
 Sidney Unwin info: Archives Alberta

Gallery 

Three-thousanders of Alberta
Mountains of Jasper National Park